The 358th Fighter Squadron is part of the 495th Fighter Group at Whiteman Air Force Base, Missouri. The squadron was reactivated there in 2015. The squadron was formerly part of the 355th Operations Group at Davis–Monthan Air Force Base, Arizona, operating the Fairchild Republic A-10 Thunderbolt II aircraft conducting close air support missions, until its 2014 inactivation.

Mission

To train and provide the United States of America with combat ready lethal and resilient airmen in support of the nation's deterrence.

History

World War II
The squadron was activated on 12 November 1942 as a Republic P-47D Thunderbolt Fighter Squadron of the 355th Fighter Group. It trained under First Air Force initially at Orlando Army Air Base, Florida, then moving for second and third stage training to Norfolk Airport in Virginia from 17 February 1943 and last at Philadelphia Airport in Pennsylvania from 4 March.  While in training, it served in an air defense role over large cities and military installations in the eastern United States.

The squadron deployed to the European Theater of Operations (ETO) in July 1943, where it became part of VIII Fighter Command in England.   The squadron's primary mission was to escort Boeing B-17 Flying Fortress and Consolidated B-24 Liberator heavy bombers to and on the return flights over Occupied Europe and Nazi Germany.  It engaged in numerous air battles on an almost daily basis with Luftwaffe day interceptor aircraft while escorting the heavy bombers.  The squadron upgraded to long-range North American P-51D Mustangs in March 1944, with the USAAF gaining air superiority with the P-51 and by 1945, almost complete air supremacy over the skies of Nazi Germany.  In addition, the squadron conducted fighter sweeps over enemy airfields, destroying Luftwaffe aircraft on the ground as well as attacking enemy targets of opportunity over Germany and Occupied Europe.  The squadron remained in combat until the German Capitulation in May 1945, moving from England to various Occupation airfields in Germany as part of the United States Air Forces in Europe army of occupation in July. On 20 December the squadron became the 56th Reconnaissance Squadron, Weather Scouting. In April 1946 the squadron returned to the United States and inactivated on 20 November.

Weather reconnaissance

The squadron was reactivated in 1951 as the 56th Strategic Reconnaissance Squadron in Japan during the Korean War.  It replaced the 512th Reconnaissance Squadron, assuming its personnel and aircraft. The squadron flew Boeing WB-29 Superfortress weather reconnaissance aircraft over North Korea in highly hazardous, almost daily strategic weather reconnaissance missions over the combat zone. Through the end of the conflict, the squadron conducted shipping surveillance and flew two reconnaissance tracks to observe and report weather conditions in the area east of the Asian land mass, between Formosa and Soviet Kamchatka Peninsula. It remained in Japan after the 1953 armistice and continued weather flights, which were sometimes ruses for strategic reconnaissance missions along the Northeast Asia coastline of the Soviet Union and along the border of the People's Republic of China.   The squadron operated the Boeing WB-50 Superfortress in 1956, continuing operations from Japan, and later Guam with the RB-50s until 1962.

Beginning in 1963, the squadron was re-equipped with new high-altitude reconnaissance Martin RB-57F Canberra aircraft modified for high altitude, long range intelligence gathering, assigned to the meteorological role.  Part of their duties involved high-altitude atmospheric sampling and radiation detection work in support of nuclear test monitoring.  Over the next decade the RB-57Fs were flown on a worldwide basis at very high altitudes at high speeds. Stress cracks began appearing in the wing spars and ribs of the RB-57Fs after a few years of service. Some were sent to General Dynamics for repairs. By 1971 the aircraft were basically worn out and they were flown to Davis–Monthan for storage. The squadron was then inactivated in early 1972.

Return to fighter operations
The squadron returned to the United States and was re-united with its World War II parent organization, and designation; its mission being a Tactical Air Command tactical fighter squadron. The 358th TFS was reactivated on 13 November 1972 under the command of Colonel Jim Ryan whose life is detailed in the authorized biography Under the Wing of a Patriot authored by the Publisher of The Sedalia Democrat, Shane Allen.  The squadron was given the name the Lobos, after Col. Ryan's German shepherd, and re-equipped with new LTV A-7D Corsair II ground attack aircraft.  After training and becoming operationally ready, the squadron was deployed to Thailand after the end of United States combat in Indochina.   Its mission was the defense of Thai airspace, and to intervene in Indochina if the terms of the 1973 Paris Peace Treaty were broken. The squadron remained in Thailand until early 1974 when it returned to the United States.  The squadron engaged in TAC training, exercises and deployments, being upgraded to the Fairchild Republic A-10 Thunderbolt II aircraft in 1979.  The squadron flew the A-10 for the next 30 years as part of Tactical Air Command and later Air Combat Command, engaging in combat with the aircraft as part of the Global War on Terrorism beginning in 2001.

The 358th was inactivated in a ceremony held at Davis–Monthan AFB on Friday, 21 February 2014 as part of the USAF's Total Force Integration policy. The squadron facilities and aircraft were assumed by the Air Force Reserve's 47th Fighter Squadron, which had inactivated in late 2013 at Barksdale Air Force Base, Louisiana, and relocated to Davis–Monthan in order to be reactivated as an AFRC A-10 Formal Training Unit once again, beginning in March 2014.

The squadron was reactivated on 18 October 2015 as part of the 495th Fighter Group (Active Associate) at Whiteman Air Force Base. The squadron is attached to the 442nd Fighter Wing. Lieutenant Colonel Jeremiah Parvin took command of the squadron on 21 June 2016.

Lineage
 Constituted as the 358th Fighter Squadron and activated on 12 November 1942
 Redesignated: 358th Fighter Squadron, Single Engine on 20 August 1943
 Redesignated: 56th Reconnaissance Squadron, Weather Scouting on 3 December 1945
 Inactivated on 20 November 1946
 Redesignated 56th Strategic Reconnaissance Squadron, Medium, Weather on 22 January 1951
 Activated on 21 February 1951
 Redesignated 56th Weather Reconnaissance Squadron on 15 February 1954
 Inactivated on 15 January 1972
 Redesignated 358th Tactical Fighter Squadron on 18 May 1972
 Activated on 1 June 1972
 Redesignated: 358th Tactical Fighter Training Squadron on 1 January 1976
 Redesignated: 358th Fighter Squadron on 1 November 1991
 Inactivated on 21 February 2014
 Activated on 18 October 2015

Assignments
 355th Fighter Group, 12 November 1942 – 20 November 1946 (attached to Orlando Fighter Wing until 17 February 1943, Norfolk Fighter Wing, until 4 March 1943, Philadelphia Fighter Wing, until 16 June 1943
 2143d Air Weather Wing, 21 February 1951
 1st Weather Wing, 8 February 1954
 9th Weather Group (later 9th Weather Reconnaissance Group), 1 February 1960
 9th Weather Reconnaissance Wing, 1 July 1965 – 15 January 1972
 355th Tactical Fighter Wing (later 355th Tactical Training Wing, 355th Fighter Wing), 1 June 1972 (attached to 354th Tactical Fighter Wing (Deployed), 28 December 1973 – 15 May 1974
 355th Operations Group, 1 May 1992 – 21 February 2014
 495th Fighter Group (Active Associate), 18 October 2015  present

Bases stationed

 Orlando Army Air Base, Florida, 12 November 1942
 Norfolk Airport, Virginia, 17 February 1943
 Philadelphia Airport, Pennsylvania, 4 March–16 June 1943
 RAF Steeple Morden, England, 8 July 1943
 AAF Station Gablingen, Germany, 16 July 1945
 AAF Station Schweinfurt, Germany, April 1946
 Mitchel Field, New York, 1 August–20 November 1946

 Misawa Air Base, Japan, 21 February 1951
 Yokota Air Base, Japan, 14 September 1951 – 15 January 1972
 Detachment operated from Andersen Air Force Base, Guam, 11 March 1960 – 18 April 1962
 Davis–Monthan Air Force Base, Arizona, 1 June 1972 – 21 February 2014
 Deployed at Korat Royal Thai Air Force Base, Thailand, 28 December 1973 – 15 May 1974
 Whiteman Air Force Base, Missouri, 18 October 2015  present

Aircraft operated
 Republic P-47 Thunderbolt (1943–1944)
 North American P-51 Mustang (1944–1945)
 Boeing WB-29 Superfortress (1951–1957)
 Boeing WB-50 Superfortress (1956–1965)
 Martin RB-57F Canberra (1962–1964, 1966–1972)
C-130 Hercules (1962–1964)
WB-47 Stratojet (1963–1966)
WC-135 Constant Phoenix (1964–1972)
 LTV A-7 Corsair II (1972–1979)
 Fairchild Republic A-10 Thunderbolt II (1979 – 2014, 2015  present)

Operations
World War II
Korean War

References

Notes

Bibliography

 
 
 
 
 

358
Military units and formations in Missouri
Fighter squadrons of the United States Army Air Forces